Monday Mornings is an American medical drama television series that ran on TNT from February 4 to April 8, 2013 and aired Mondays after Dallas. It is based on the 2012 novel of the same name by Sanjay Gupta. In May 2012, TNT placed a ten-episode order for the series. On May 10, 2013, TNT canceled Monday Mornings after one season, along with Southland.

Plot
The series follows the professional and personal lives of five doctors at the fictional Chelsea General Hospital in Portland, Oregon. The series title refers to the weekly peer-reviewed conferences held on Monday mornings, at which the surgeons receive both praise for their accomplishments and lambasting for their mistakes, usually from the sharp-tongued and often sarcastic Dr. Hooten.

Cast and characters

Main 
 Alfred Molina as Chief of Staff Dr. Harding Hooten
 Ving Rhames as trauma chief Dr. Jorge "El Gato Negro" Villanueva
 Bill Irwin as transplant chief Dr. Buck Tierney
 Jamie Bamber as attending neurosurgeon Dr. Tyler Wilson
 Jennifer Finnigan as attending neurosurgeon Dr. Tina Ridgeway
 Keong Sim as attending neurosurgeon Dr. Sung Park
 Sarayu Rao as attending cardiothoracic surgeon Dr. Sydney Napur
 Emily Swallow as neurosurgical resident Dr. Michelle Robidaux

Recurring 
 Jason Gray-Stanford as hospital attorney Scott Henderson
 Anthony Heald as malpractice attorney Mitch Tompkins	
 Jonathan Silverman as internist Dr. John Lieberman
 Valerie Mahaffey as Fran Horowitz from Risk Management
 Ewan Chung as anaesthesiologist Dr. Wong

Episodes

Home media 
As of 2014, Warner does not plan to release the series physically in the United States. As of November 2014, the only home video release was made in Germany, where Studiocanal acquired the rights and released it on DVD on November 20, 2014.

Reception

Critical response 
 
Metacritic  gives the show a score of 55% based on reviews from 22 critics.

Ratings

References

External links
 
 

2010s American drama television series
2013 American television series debuts
2013 American television series endings
2010s American medical television series
English-language television shows
Television shows based on American novels
Television shows set in Oregon
Television shows set in Portland, Oregon
TNT (American TV network) original programming